Iestyn Polson is an English music producer, engineer, songwriter, musician, and mixer best known for his work with David Gray, Patti Smith and David Bowie. Originally from London,  Polson is currently based in New York City.

Iestyn Polson grew up in London, England, and formed his first band at age 11. Polson learned to play multiple instruments throughout his childhood and later became interested in record production. Through engineering in studios in London, Polson was introduced to singer/songwriter David Gray who was compiling demos at the time. The two began working together resulting in the multi-platinum selling  album White Ladder. The album was made for less than $5,000 in the UK singer-songwriter's London apartment, and combines Gray's now signature sound of electronic grooves and acoustic folk. Polson used custom loops and samples programmed and sequenced with an Akai sampler. Iestyn has collaborated with David Gray on every album since then including the most recent forthcoming album.

In addition to Polson's collaboration with Gray, he has produced and engineered albums for Simple Kid, David Bowie, David Usher, Patti Smith, and James Maddock. Iestyn Polson is represented exclusively by Global Positioning Services in Santa Monica and New York City.

Discography

References

External links
 http://www.cduniverse.com/search/xx/music/artist/Iestyn+Polson/a/albums.htm
 http://www.artistdirect.com/artist/iestyn-polson/912863

Living people
Year of birth missing (living people)